Charles Swindall (February 13, 1876 – June 19, 1939) was a U.S. Representative from Oklahoma.

Early life

Born at College Mound near Terrell, Texas, Swindall attended the public schools and Vanderbilt University, Nashville, Tennessee.
He graduated from Cumberland School of Law at Cumberland University, Lebanon, Tennessee, in 1897.

Career
Charles Swindall was admitted to the bar the same year and commenced practice in Woodward, Oklahoma. Swindall was the prosecuting attorney of Day (later Ellis) County 1898-1900. In 1900, he returned to Woodward to continue his law practice, working primarily with the Texas Cattle Raisers Association on cattle rustling cases, achieving 33 convictions.

Congressional Service

In the 1916 Republican National Convention, Swindall served as an Oklahoma delegate. He was a member of the Oklahoma State Republican Committee from 1919 to 1929. Swindall was elected as a Republican to the Sixty-sixth Congress to fill the vacancy caused by the death of Dick T. Morgan, and served from November 2, 1920, to March 3, 1921, serving on the Public Land Committee. Following his unsuccessful bid for renomination to the Sixty-seventh Congress, he returned to his practice in Woodward, Oklahoma.

Judicial Service
He was appointed April 26, 1924, judge of the twentieth judicial district of Oklahoma. Swindall holds the title of the first Oklahoma judge to give a death sentence for committing a robbery with firearms. However, the defendant's sentence was later reduced to life imprisonment.

He served as a justice of the Oklahoma Supreme Court from 1929 to 1934. Swindall refused to be partisan in his nominees, preferring to judge candidates on their qualifications, not their loyalty to a particular party. Wanting Swindall to only support Republicans, the Oklahoma State Election Board refused Swindall's renomination to his post. Swindall sued the Board and was victorious in his suit, but did not win re-election.

Following his judicial appointments, he resumed the practice of law in Oklahoma City, Oklahoma.

Personal life and death

In 1911 Charles Swindall and Emma Endres were wed. Charles Swindall died of a heart attack on June 19, 1939 in Oklahoma City, and was interred in Memorial Park Cemetery.

Sources

External links

 

1876 births
1939 deaths
People from Woodward, Oklahoma
Justices of the Oklahoma Supreme Court
Oklahoma state court judges
Republican Party members of the United States House of Representatives from Oklahoma
People from Kaufman County, Texas
People from Terrell, Texas
20th-century American politicians